Junkers Profly GmbH is a former German aircraft manufacturer based in Kulmbach. The company specialized in the design and manufacture of ultralight trikes and fixed wing aircraft. The company was formerly located in Kodnitz.

Junkers Profly still exists in 2014, but it does not currently produce any of its own designs. Instead it markets the ProFe Banjo family of aircraft for ProFe as well as provides flight training, accessories and aircraft parts.

Aircraft

References

External links

Aircraft manufacturers of Germany
Ultralight trikes
Homebuilt aircraft